David Charles Tarpey (born 14 November 1988) is an English footballer who plays for Isthmian League South Central Division side Leatherhead.

Career
Tarpey began his career at Henley Town, where he played for two years in the senior team before joining Basingstoke Town in 2007. After two years with Basingstoke, he joined Hampton & Richmond Borough to seek more frequent first-team football. Tarpey broke into the first team following loan spells with Walton & Hersham and Chertsey Town, before joining Farnborough in June 2012 after turning down a new contract at the Beveree.

Tarpey scored 13 league goals in eighteen months at the Yellows before his contract was cancelled in January 2014 by mutual consent. He then re-joined Hampton.

For the 2014–15 season, Tarpey joined Maidenhead United. After 36 league goals in his first two seasons, he scored 44 goals in 41 league games in the 2016–17 season as Maidenhead won the National League South, a new record for the league.

He turned down an offer from Coventry City in summer 2017 and signed a new contract with the Magpies. He opened his first season in the National League with seven goals in his first six games, before signing for Barnet on 31 August 2017 which enabled him to leave his full-time job as a fire & security alarm installer. Tarpey injured his anterior cruciate ligament in his second appearance for the Bees, ruling him out for the remainder of the 2017–18 season. Tarpey returned from injury in October 2018 before re-joining Maidenhead on loan on 26 November 2018.

On 4 February 2019, Tarpey reunited with former manager, Alan Dowson at Woking on a 28-day loan. 
He scored his first goal for the club in his second appearance against East Thurrock United. He returned to Barnet and scored for them for the first time on the 19th of March against Harrogate Town. Tarpey turned down the offer of a new contract from the Bees and left the club at the end of the 2018–19 season in order to return to part-time football.

On the 23 May 2019 it was confirmed in an interview by Alan Dowson that Tarpey would be rejoining Woking on a permanent contract for the following season. He scored nine goals in 51 games for the Cards before joining Isthmian League side Bracknell Town for the 2021-22 season. Following just one campaign in Berkshire with Bracknell, Tarpey announced he would be leaving the club in May 2022, with thirty appearances and nineteen goals to his name.

On 18 May 2022, after leaving Bracknell, Tarpey opted to join newly-relegated, Leatherhead for the 2022–23 campaign.

Career statistics

Honours

Club
Maidenhead United
National League South: 2016–17

Bracknell Town
Isthmian League South Central Division: 2021–22

Individual
National League South Golden Boot: 2016–17
National League South Player of the Year: 2016-17

References

External links

1988 births
Living people
People from Henley-on-Thames
English footballers
Association football forwards
Henley Town F.C. players
Basingstoke Town F.C. players
Hampton & Richmond Borough F.C. players
Walton & Hersham F.C. players
Chertsey Town F.C. players
Farnborough F.C. players
Maidenhead United F.C. players
Barnet F.C. players
Woking F.C. players
Bracknell Town F.C. players
Leatherhead F.C. players
English Football League players
National League (English football) players
Isthmian League players